The Essence Part One is an album by the American jazz pianist Ahmad Jamal, containing performances recorded in Paris in 1994 and New York City in 1995. It was released on the Birdology label in 1995.

Critical reception
Richard S. Ginell, in his review for AllMusic, states: "This absorbing collection is a testament to the continuing ability of Ahmad Jamal to startle and engage jazz listeners."

Track listing
All compositions by Ahmad Jamal unless noted.
 "Flight" – 6:29 
 "Toulouse" – 6:55 
 "The Essence" – 10:10 
 "Lover Man" (Jimmy Davis, Ram Ramirez, James Sherman) – 5:45 
 "Catalina" – 6:40 
 "Autumn Leaves" (Joseph Kosma, Johnny Mercer, Jacques Prévert) – 6:56 
 "Street of Dreams" (Sam M. Lewis, Victor Young) – 5:33 
 "Bahia" (Ary Barroso) – 6:34

Personnel
Ahmad Jamal – piano
James Cammack – bass (tracks 1, 2, 4, 5, 7 & 8)
Jamil Nasser – bass (tracks 3 & 6)
Idris Muhammad – drums 
Manolo Badrena – percussion
George Coleman – tenor saxophone (tracks 3 & 6)

References 

Verve Records albums
Ahmad Jamal albums
1995 albums